The 105 kg Strongman World Championships is a (mostly) annual competition featuring strength athletes from all over the world, competing for the title of the strongest man in the world with a body weight below 105 kg. Created initially by the International Federation of Strength Athletes, the series was eventually moved to become part of the Strongman Champions League, a series created by two former IFSA members Ilkka Kinnunen and Marcel Mostertas.

Champions

Individual Results

2007
In 2007 the World Championships were held in China, with 17 athletes from 16 different countries participated in the event. The competitions consisted of 10 events over the course of 1 week.

2009
In 2009 and 2010 the contest was held in Kiev, Ukraine during the same weekend as the SCL Finals, with co-organizers Vladimir & Olena Kiba from the Ukrainian Federation of Strength Athletes (UFSA).

2010

2013

2015

2016

2017

See also 
Strongman Champions League
The World Log Lift Championships

References

External links 

Official Site of Strongman Champions League

Strongmen competitions